The Soren Simonsen House, located at 55 W. 200 North in Monroe, Utah, was built in c.1880.  It was listed on the National Register of Historic Places in 1982.

It is a one-and-a-half-story, brick, vernacular pair-house with two internal chimneys.

It was deemed "significant as an example of Scandinavian vernacular architecture in Utah."

References

Pair-houses
Houses on the National Register of Historic Places in Utah
Houses completed in 1880
Sevier County, Utah